Kendall is an unincorporated area and census-designated place in Miami-Dade County, Florida. At the 2020 census, the area had a population of 80,241.

History
Much of what is now Kendall was purchased from the State of Florida in 1883 by the Florida Land and Mortgage Company. It was named for Henry John Broughton Kendall, a director of the company, who moved to the area in the 1900s to manage the company's land. As the land was not open to homesteading, development was slow well into the 20th century. A post office opened in 1914, and the first school opened in 1929. After the end of the land boom in 1926, some residents left. Two Seminole camps were in the Kendall area, and Seminoles continued to live there into the 1940s.

Prior to the 1950s, the term "Kendall" was used to describe a region centered around U.S. Route 1, bounded by Snapper Creek to the north, the Everglades to the west, Old Cutler Road to the east, and the former community of Rockdale to the south. This area was largely uninhabited, generally consisting of pine rockland interspersed with fields and groves. As the region experienced rapid development in the 1950s, the moniker "Kendall" came to refer to the various communities built in the vicinity of present-day  Pinecrest and the eastern half of the current Kendall CDP. When growth shifted west in the 1970s, '80s, and '90s, the usage of the term steadily shifted west concurrently, and today it is most often applied to the area more formally known as West Kendall. Prior to incorporation in 1996, the Village of Pinecrest was still included in the official boundaries of Kendall CDP.

In August 1992, Kendall and the surrounding South Dade area were severely damaged by Hurricane Andrew. Many of the homes and businesses in the area were destroyed. In the subsequent years, the area was slowly rebuilt.

Geography
It is bordered to the east by the village of Pinecrest, to the southeast by the village of Palmetto Bay, to the south by Palmetto Estates and Richmond Heights, to the southwest by Three Lakes, to the west by The Crossings, to the northwest by Kendale Lakes, to the north by Sunset, and to the northeast by Glenvar Heights.

U.S. Route 1 forms the eastern boundary of Kendall; it leads northeast to Miami and southwest  to Homestead. The Homestead Extension of Florida's Turnpike forms the western boundary of Kendall, leading north  to Doral and south  to its southern terminus at Florida City. The Don Shula Expressway (Florida State Road 874) crosses Kendall from northeast to southwest.

Climate
Kendall has a tropical monsoon climate (Am) which is similar to the remainder of Miami-Dade County, although its inland location does make it cooler at night and warmer during the day.

Demographics

2020 census

As of the 2020 United States census, there were 80,241 people, 28,610 households, and 19,203 families residing in the CDP.

2010 census

In 2010, there were 31,899 households and 8.7% were vacant. In 2000, 33.4% households had children under the age of 18 living with them, 51.0% were married couples living together, 13.8% had a female householder with no husband present, and 31.0% were non-families. 24.4% of all households were made up of individuals, and 7.3% had someone living alone who was 65 years of age or older. The average household size was 2.61 and the average family size was 3.14.

2000 census
In 2000, 23.3% of the population were under the age of 18, 8.6% from 18 to 24, 31.8% from 25 to 44, 24.9% from 45 to 64, and 11.5% who were 65 years of age or older. The median age was 37 years. For every 100 females, there were 88.5 males. For every 100 females age 18 and over, there were 83.4 males.

In 2000, the median household income was $51,330 and the median family income was $61,241. Males had a median income of $42,875 and females $31,416. The per capita income was $27,914. About 5.7% of families and 8.6% of the population were below the poverty line, including 8.0% of those under age 18 and 10.9% of those age 65 or over.

In 2000, 52.46% of residents spoke Spanish at home, while those who spoke only English comprised 40.38%. Speakers of Portuguese were 1.49% of the population, French 1.12%, and French Creole 0.95%.

Transportation

Kendall is served by Metrobus throughout the area, and by the Metrorail at:
   Dadeland North (SW 70th Avenue and U.S. 1)
   Dadeland South (Dadeland Boulevard and U.S. 1)
Both stations provide metro service from Dadeland to nearby commercial centers like the city of Coral Gables, Downtown Miami, and Miami International Airport. Dadeland South station is a major transit depot in the area, connecting the southernmost cities of Homestead and Florida City to Metrorail via limited-stop bus rapid transit along the South Miami-Dade Busway.

Economy
Pollo Tropical has its headquarters in Dadeland, Kendall. The headquarters moved to Dadeland in 1994.

Kendall is the site of Dadeland Mall, an upscale indoor shopping mall in East Kendall with Macy's, Saks Fifth Avenue and JCPenney as anchor stores. In South Kendall, directly south of Dadeland Mall on US-1 is The Falls (mall), an open-air shopping mall with Macy's as anchor store as well as a Regal Cinema.

Prior to its dissolution, Air Florida was headquartered in the Dade Towers in what is now the Kendall CDP.

Government and infrastructure
The Miami-Dade Police Department operates the Kendall District Station in the CDP.

Notable people
Hank Kaplan, boxing historian
Janet Reno, 78th U.S. Attorney General
O. J. Simpson, American football player

Education

Primary, middle and secondary schools

Public schools
The first public school in Kendall was Kendall School, now renamed Kenwood K-8 Center. Kenwood is the site of the Kenwoods Hammock, a native forest planting which has become a world-renowned stop for bird watchers.

Miami-Dade County Public Schools serves Kendall.

Kindergarten - 12th grade
Instructional Center System Wide
Ruth Owen Kruse Education Center

High schools
Miami Killian High School is in the CDP.
Miami Palmetto High School in Pinecrest serves a portion of the CDP.
School for Advanced Studies (Kendall campus)
Miami Sunset Senior High School
Felix Varela Senior High School

Middle schools
Archimedean Middle Conservatory (charter)
Miami MacArthur South
Pinecrest Academy (North Campus) (charter)
Hammocks Middle School
Howard D. McMillan Middle School
Arvida Middle School

Elementary schools
Academir Charter School West
Archimedean Academy (charter)
Bowman Foster Ashe Elementary School
Calusa Elementary School
Christina M. Eve Elementary School
Claude Pepper Elementary School
Dante B. Fascell Elementary School
Devon Aire K–8 Center
Dr. Manuel C. Barreiro Elementary School
Gilbert Porter Elementary School
Jane S. Roberts K–8 School
Kendale Elementary
Kendale Lakes Elementary
Kenwood Elementary
Leewood Elementary School
Oliver Hoover Elementary School
Santa Fe Advantage Academy (charter)
Sunset Park Elementary School
Vineland K–8 Center
Winston Park K–8 Center
William H. Lehman Elementary

Private schools
Atlantis Academy (K–12)
Calusa Preparatory School
Cattoira Montessori School (PK–5)
Children's Resources (PK–2)
Florida Christian School
Gateway Christian School
Greenfield Day School (K–8)
Islamic School of Miami
Kendall Christian School (PK–5)
Killian Oaks Academy
La Scuola (PK–3)
Learning Links Schoolhouse (K–5)
St. Catherine of Siena Catholic School (of the Roman Catholic Archdiocese of Miami)
St. John Neuman School (PK–8) - Established in 1981. 
Westminster Christian School
Westwood Christian School

Colleges and universities
College of Business and Technology (Kendall Campus)
Kaplan University (Support Center)
Keiser College
Miami-Dade College (Kendall Campus)
Nova Southeastern University (Miami Student Educational Center)
 Polleo Institute (Tertiary education)

Supplementary schools
Miami Hoshuko, a weekend school for Japanese citizens, previously held classes at the Kendall United Methodist Church, now in Pinecrest but formerly in the Kendall CDP as of 1990.

Media
West Kendall is served by the Miami market for local radio and television. Kendall has its own newspaper, The Kendall Gazette, which is published twice monthly and is part of Miami Community Newspapers.

References

External links
 - The Kendall CDP as of 1990 is on pages 85, 100, 101, 102, 114, 115, and 116.

Kendall, Florida
Unincorporated communities in Miami-Dade County, Florida
Census-designated places in Miami-Dade County, Florida
Census-designated places in Florida
Unincorporated communities in Florida